Zercon is a genus of mites in the family Zerconidae. There are more than 130 described species in Zercon.

See also
 List of Zercon species

References

Zerconidae
Articles created by Qbugbot